Perfluorohexane, or tetradecafluorohexane, is a fluorocarbon. It is a derivative of hexane in which all of the hydrogen atoms are replaced by fluorine atoms. It is used in one formulation of the electronic cooling liquid/insulator Fluorinert for low-temperature applications due to its low boiling point of 56 °C and freezing point of −90 °C. It is odorless and colorless. Unlike typical hydrocarbons, the structure features a helical carbon backbone.

Oxygen solubility
Because it is biologically inert and chemically stable, perfluorohexane has attracted attention in medicine. Like other fluorocarbons, perfluorohexane dissolves gases, including oxygen from the air, to a higher concentration than ordinary organic solvents. This effect is attributed to the weak intermolecular forces between perfluorohexane molecules, which allows "space" for gas molecules to partition into the liquid. Animals can be submerged in a bath of oxygenated perfluorohexane without drowning, as there is sufficient oxygen available in the solvent to allow respiration to continue. This effect has led to the experimental use of perfluorohexane in treating burn victims, as their lungs can be filled with either perfluorohexane vapor or in extreme cases liquid perfluorohexane, allowing breathing to continue without the problems normally seen with pulmonary edema that sometimes occur when the inside of the lungs have been burnt e.g. by inhalation of hot smoke. Research was particularly active on the topic of partial liquid ventilation (PLV) in the 1990s and early 2000s, however, perfluorohexane and other perfluorocarbons showed no significant improvement of patient outcomes in clinical trials.

Alternatives
Perfluorohexane has extremely high global warming potential (GWP) of 9,300. This leads to a need to find low GWP alternative. Novec 649 was considered a good drop-in replacement in many applications due to its similar thermo-physical properties and having a global warming potential of 1.

See also
Novec 649/1230
Fluorinert
Liquid dielectric

References 

Perfluoroalkanes
Halogenated solvents
Coolants
Greenhouse gases